Maskelyne may refer to:

People 
Nevil Maskelyne (MP) (1711–1679), English landowner, MP for Cricklade
Nevil Maskelyne (1732–1811), the fifth British Astronomer Royal
Nevil Story Maskelyne (1823–1911), English geologist, MP for Cricklade
Nevill Maskelyne Smyth (1868–1941), British Army office, recipient of the Victoria Cross
Ryan Maskelyne (born 1999), Australian-born Papua New Guinean Olympic swimmer
The Maskelyne family of British magicians:
John Nevil Maskelyne (1829–1917), stage magician
Nevil Maskelyne (magician) (1863–1924), son of John Nevil
Jasper Maskelyne (1902–1973), stage magician in the 1930s and 1940s, son of Nevil

Other uses 
Maskelyne, a solitary lunar crater
Maskelynes Islands, in Vanuatu
Maskelynes language 
Maskelyne Passage, Antarctica